This page shows the results of the Weightlifting Competition at the 2003 Pan American Games, held from August 12 to August 16, 2003 in Santo Domingo, Dominican Republic. There were a total number of fifteen medal events, eight for men and seven for women.

Men's competition

Flyweight (– 56 kg)
Held on 2003-08-12

Featherweight (– 62 kg)
Held on 2003-08-12

Lightweight (– 69 kg)
Held on 2003-08-13

Middleweight (– 77 kg)
Held on 2003-08-14

Light-heavyweight (– 85 kg)
Held on 2003-08-14

Middle-heavyweight (– 94 kg)
Held on 2003-08-15

Heavyweight (– 105 kg)
Held on 2003-08-16

Super heavyweight (+ 105 kg)
Held on 2003-08-16

Women's competition

Flyweight (– 48 kg)
Held on 2003-08-12

Featherweight (– 53 kg)
Held on 2003-08-13

Lightweight (– 58 kg)
Held on 2003-08-13

Middleweight (– 63 kg)
Held on 2003-08-14

Light-heavyweight (– 69 kg)
Held on 2003-08-15

Heavyweight (– 75 kg)
Held on 2003-08-15

Super heavyweight (+ 75 kg)
Held on 2003-08-16

Medal table

See also
Weightlifting at the 2004 Summer Olympics

References

 Sports 123
 HickokSports
 cbc

P
2003
Events at the 2003 Pan American Games